The Bridge of Ajuda is a dilapidated bridge that crosses the Guadiana River between Elvas and Olivenza.

History

 
The bridge was constructed between 1520 and 1521, during the reign of King D. Manuel I of Portugal from the left bank of the Guadiana, in the parish of Senhora da Ajuda, along a roadway segment between Elvas and Olivença (and attributed to the "Arruda brothers"). During 1597, many of the archways were damaged or destroyed during flooding.

Between 1640 and 1642, Matias de Albuquerque, Governor of the Alentejo, began the refortification of Olivença with the construction of a third or fourth lines of walls. During this period it is possible that the bridge was rebuilt, since it was in a state of ruin at the time of the Governor's visit to Elvas and Olivença. However, it was partially destroyed by Spanish forces in 1657. It was then rebuilt in the same century.

In 1705, redoubts were constructed to reinforce the bridge over the Guadiana, designed by Manuel da Maia. In 1709 the bridge was partially demolished by artillery during the War of the Spanish Succession.

The Spanish army, under the command of D. Manuel Godoy annexed the town of Olivença in 1801.

In 1903, in Vila Viçosa, King D. Carlos proposed the reconstruction of the bridge.

On 24 January 1967 the Portuguese government declared the bridge a Imóvel de Interesse Público (Property of Public Interest). This was complimented, on 13 March 2009, when the Spanish government declared the bridge as a Bien de Interés Cultural (Possession of Cultural Interest).

Architecture

Eight arches remain along the right margin and 5 along the left margin, consisting of inconsistent rounded arches supported by talhamares. The archivolts, with two rows of staves, are supported by quadrangular pillars reinforced by high talhamares. Along the main platform, an old tower was erected along the sixth arch of the right bank, which was constructed over large boulders, now visible along the margin.

See also
 Guadiana International Bridge
 Lower Guadiana International bridge

References

Sources
 
 
 
 
 
 
 
 
 
 
 

Bridges in Portugal
Bridges in Spain
Bridges over the Guadiana River
Portugal–Spain border crossings
Listed bridges in Portugal